Bogafjell is a borough of the city of Sandnes in the west part of the large municipality of Sandnes in Rogaland county, Norway.  The borough lies south of the city centre, surrounding the Bogafjell mountain.  The borough has a population (2016) of 7,080.  The borough was created in 2011 when it was split off from the borough of Austrått.  The area is a relatively new area that has become built up in the since the turn of the century.  There are two schools in the borough as well as Bogafjell Church.

References

External links
 Bogafjell.com

Boroughs and neighbourhoods of Sandnes